John Bigg may refer to:

John Bigg (MP) (1652 – c.1710), MP for Huntingdon 1689
John Bigg (died 1748), MP for Huntingdonshire 1715–1734
John Stanyan Bigg (1828–1865), English poet
John Bigg (hermit) (1629–1696), the Dinton hermit

See also
John Bigge (disambiguation)
John Big, fictional character
Jack Bigg (1912–1975), Canadian police officer, lawyer and politician
John Biggs (disambiguation)